Heino is a masculine given name. Notable people with the name include:

Heino (born 1938), German schlager and volksmusik music singer
Heino Anto (1882–1955), Estonian playwright, actor, politician and journalist
Heino Dissing (1912–1990), Danish cyclist and Olympic competitor
Heino Eller (1887–1970), Estonian composer and composition teacher
Heino Enden (born 1959), Estonian professional basketball power forward 
Heino Ferch (born 1963), German film and television actor
Heino Finkelmann (born 1945), German chemist and professor 
Heino Heinrich Graf von Flemming (1632–1706), German field marshal and Governor of Berlin
Heino Hansen (born 1947), Danish football player and Olympic competitor
Heino von Heimburg (1889–1945), German Vice Admiral of the Kriegsmarine and U-boat commander during WWI
Heino Heinaste (1928–2006), Estonian track and field athlete
Heino Holm (born 1979), Danish handballer
Heino Kaski (1885–1957), Finnish composer and pianist
Heino Kiik (1927–2013), Estonian writer and journalist
Heino Kostabi (1933–2021), Estonian politician
Heino Kuhn (born 1984), South African cricketer
Heino Kruus (1926–2012), Estonian basketball player and Olympic competitor 
Heino Kurvet (born 1946), Estonian sprint canoeist and Olympic medalist 
Heino Lill (born 1944), Estonian basketball coach and basketball player
Heino Lipp (1922–2006), Estonian decathlete
Heino Lind (1931–2008), Estonian sport sailor
Heino Mandri (1922-1990), Estonian actor 
Heino Meyer-Bahlburg (born 1940), German-born American psychologist
Heino Pars (1925–2014), Estonian animated film director
Heino Pulli (born 1938), Finnish ice hockey player
Heino Puuste (born 1955), Estonian javelin thrower and Olympic competitor 
Heino von Rantzau (1894–1946), German Generalleutnant in the Luftwaffe during World War II
Heino Schmieden (1835-1913), German architect
Heino Senekal (born 1975), Namibian rugby player
Heino Sild (1944–2009), Estonian shot putter
Heino Sisask (born 1928), Estonian politician, racewalker and sports personality
Heino Thielemann (born 1923), German field hockey player and Olympic competitor
Heino Torga (1933–2012), Estonian theatre director and actor

Estonian masculine given names
Finnish masculine given names
German masculine given names